A gesture is a body movement that conveys some meaning.

Gesture  may refer also to:
 Gesture (music)
 Gesture recognition in computing
 The Gestures, a teenage American rock band based 
 Gestures (album), an album by Maksim Mrvica
 Pointing device gesture, an interaction with a computer interface using a pointing device or finger